Alcester Academy (formerly known as Alcester High School Technology College) is a state secondary school that educates girls and boys aged between 11 and 16, in Alcester, Warwickshire, England. It serves both Alcester and other surrounding villages such as Bidford-on-Avon.

History
Alcester High School is located on the site of the old Greville High School (named after Fulke Greville, 1st Baron Brooke) which opened in 1966. When Greville closed in 1985, the students were transferred to Alcester High along with students from Bidford High School. In 2004, a £1.8m expansion programme began creating a two-storey English block with 12 new classrooms, and extensions to the art and music blocks.

Alcester High became a specialist technology college in 1998 with an investment of £250,000. After being awarded 'high performing' status as a Technology College, Alcester High School was invited to apply for a second subject specialism. After a great deal of consultation and planning it was decided to apply for music specialism. This was approved by the Secretary of State for Education  and the school became a specialist music college in 2006.

Previously a community school administered by Warwickshire County Council, in August 2011 Alcester High School Technology College converted to academy status and was renamed Alcester Academy.

Results
Percentage of year 11 students gaining 5 or more grades A* to C at GCSE level:
 2010: 55%
 2011: 59%
 2012:	61%
 2013:	62%

Awards 
In 2016, Alcester Academy's maths department won Maths Team of the Year at the Times Education Supplement (TES) Schools Awards. The Academy was the only secondary school in Warwickshire to be nominated for the awards.

Art teacher, James Yarrington, was also one of the eight nominees shortlisted for Art Teacher of the Year.

References

External links 
 Alcester Academy homepage

Academies in Warwickshire
Secondary schools in Warwickshire
Alcester
Specialist technology colleges in England
Specialist music colleges in England